El Desperado may refer to:
 El Desperado (wrestler), Japanese professional wrestler
 El Desperado (album), an album by Let 3
 The Dirty Outlaws, also known as El desperado, 1967 Italian Spaghetti Western

See also
 Desperado (disambiguation)